Lee Adrien Lescaze (December 8, 1938 – July 26, 1996) was an American journalist from Manhattan. After attending Harvard University, he worked as an editor successively at The Washington Post and The Wall Street Journal. During his Washington D.C., assignment, the FBI rented his Georgetown house as a safe house in the ABSCAM sting operation.

Lee Lescaze was the son of the famous early American modernist architect William Lescaze (1896–1969).

References

1938 births
1996 deaths
American male journalists
20th-century American writers
Harvard University alumni
20th-century American journalists
20th-century American male writers
Journalists from New York City
People from Manhattan
The Wall Street Journal people
The Washington Post people